Derya Karadaş (born 4 May 1981) is a Turkish actress of Kurdish origin. Her family, who lived in Bingöl until they moved to Istanbul in 1980. She believes Alevism.

She rose to prominence with her role as Zerrin in Yalan Dünya. She studied at the Müjdat Gezen Art Center conservatory and is an instructor at the same institute.

Filmography

Programs

Movies 
{| class="wikitable"
!Year
!Title
|-
|2008
|Fırtına
|-
|2015
|Geniş Aile: Yapıştır
|-
|2015
|Şeytan Tüyü
|-
|2017
|Cici Babam
|-
|2017
|Aile Arasında
|-
|2022
|Yılbaşı Gecesi
|}

 TV series 

 Theater 
 Dur Bi Dakka'' (2012)

References 

1981 births
Actresses from Istanbul
Turkish film actresses
Turkish television actresses
Turkish stage actresses
Living people
21st-century Turkish actresses
Turkish people of Kurdish descent